The African Union of Railways is an organisation under the auspices of the new African Union dealing with railways.  It is similar to the International Union of Railways (UIC).

Overview 
Africa's railways are disjointed and disconnected.  The AUR hopes to rectify things. By 2012 a number of railway projects had been proposed to rectify this, some of which would make connections between international railway systems.  This interconnectivity would require the development of more standardised systems.

Standards

Gauge 
The AUR sees that conversion to a common gauge is too difficult and expensive due to the gauge muddle, but based on reports from the World Bank, does see the following gauges as preferred in the following regions:

 North - 
 South -  mostly connected and quite strong.  
 East -  (but Tanzania, Kenya, Uganda and isolated Ethiopia are  ).
 West -  (but Sierra Leone and Nigeria  are isolated).
 Other
  South Africa NG
  Eritrea NG
  Algeria NG - isolated systems
 Scattered mining railways -  plus Gabon.

Several railways such as Senegal, Guinea and Tanzania have talked about conversion to standard gauge, though it remains to be seen if talk develops into action.  Guinea built one new branch as standard gauge even though metre gauge is needed to take the ore to the port.  Nigeria has built one short branch with dual gauge sleepers, and a network aiming to serve the port of Warri is also standard gauge.  An extension from Tanzania into Rwanda is proposed as standard gauge, though it starts at a station that is already a container transhipment dry port.  Mining railways that carry very large tonnages (> 10,000 metric tonnes per year) are generally standard gauge.

However, conspicuous by their absence, is the possibility of dual gauge, containerisation, variable gauge axles, bogie exchange, piggy back operation and even triple gauge.

However the African Union now supports the 50-year plan to build the African Integrated High Speed Railway Network.

Timeline

2014 

Construction of standard gauge lines has started in
 Ethiopia and Eritrea
 Kenya
 Railway stations in Tanzania
 Nigeria
 Ghana
 Cameroon

Break of gauge 

Because the mainlines of different countries of different gauges rarely meet, except Kidatu, break of gauge is paradoxically  not a problem at the moment.

Couplings 
Couplings in use include:

 European style buffers and chain couplers, the spacing and height of the buffers varying with the gauge;
 Norwegian chopper couplings of various kinds, which are low in strength and obsolete.
 AAR coupler - an automatic type used throughout the contiguous Southern African network.
 SA3 coupler - an automatic type used in the former Soviet Union.
 More than one of the above, such as buffers and AAR coupler.
 There are a few other uncommon and obsolete types, such as those used in Benin. 

The American AAR coupler is the most widely used of the modern types, and is usable with the heaviest trains of regularly .

Whatever the advantages of the modern SA3 coupler, it is not as widely used as the AAR and is in the minority.

Match wagons can overcome incompatibilities at the price of extra deadweight. Similarly with coupling adapters.

The type of coupling is less important when trains travel in fixed block loads.

Modern wagons are usually built with draw-gear designed for easy conversion to some kind of centre coupling such as the AAR or SA3.

Brakes 
Westinghouse air brakes and vacuum brakes (or no continuous brakes at all) are usually fitted.  Dual brakes or piped only can overcome incompatibilities.  Vacuum brakes are considered to be obsolete.  Electronically controlled pneumatic brakes (ECP) are starting to be fitted on faster, heavy-duty trains for higher performance, and the two ECP systems are compatible.  Air brakes are to be preferred to vacuum brakes because of their greater power.

Electrification 
Most railways in Africa are diesel-operated, but electrification where it exists it mostly conforms to the modern standard of 25 kV AC, with some obsolete systems using the older 3 kV DC.  Trams in cities are usually low voltage such as 750 VDC. Dual and multi voltage locomotives and electric multiple units (EMUs) are proven technology.  Africa has great hydro-electric potential to run electric trains with, though this would not happen overnight.

Loading gauge 
Loading gauges vary considerably, and through trains would be forced to use the most restrictive loading gauge along its route. The structure gauge of tunnels and bridges needs to be about  taller to allow for piggy back operation of trains of one gauge on the wagons of another gauge.

The loading gauge width for new standard gauge railways in Ethiopia and Kenya is following the  standard for high speed lines pioneered by Shinkansen in Japan, and followed by South Korea and China.  May also be followed by Tanzania and Nigeria.

Platform and carriage floor heights should be standardised, as well as the gap between platform and carriage.

Axle loads 
Axle loads vary considerably, depending on the strength of the track, especially the weight of the rails which are generally too light for modern traffic.

The Kribi-Mbalam iron ore railway has an axleload of 37.5T.

Train lengths and crossing loop lengths 
Crossing loops should be as long as the longest likely train, considered globally. Extra length of the loop enables the rear of the train to clear the main line at more than line speed thus saving time.

Because of dangers imposed by wild animals such as lions, manual control of loops turnouts is not necessarily a good idea, and some degree of automation of these turnouts, and fencing, is desirable.

Minimum radius 
Limits speeds, although speeds are less important on minor branch lines. Minimum radius also affects heaviest trains, due to tendency to pull wagons off the rails and derail them.

Language 
Confusion and even accidents can occur if more than one language (or accent) is used to operate a railway.  A simplified language such as seaspeak would be useful to reduce such problems.
 Pécrot rail crash with confusion of Dutch and French speakers.
 Complicated phrases can be simplified and made succinct by using say telegraphic codes.
 Great Western Railway telegraphic codes
 Australian railway telegraphic codes
 Railway block code
 Commercial code
 Words can be spelled out over noisy lines using say the NATO phonetic alphabet.
 Names of stations should be distinguishable from one another. Similarly the Post Office doesn't like towns spoken or written alike.
 Thus the village of Perth in NewSouth Walwa was getting mail intended for Perth, Scotland and Perth, Western Australia, so it was renamed Perthville.
 Thus Makutopora and Makutupora are two distinct localities.

Namibia 
Namibia has been using Tubular Modular Track. Tubular Modular Track maintains its track resilience even in harshest sandy desert conditions. Transnet Freight Rail in South Africa uses Tubular Modular Track in the main Ermelo yard on its 70 million tonnes per annum heavy haul coal export line. The continuous support provided by Tubular Modular Track increases rails and turnout life by a factor of two and weld life by a factor of ten (compared to conventional and slabtrack offering discrete support for rails). The Passenger Rail Agency of South Africa (PRASA) uses Tubular Modular Track in stations to ensure fixed vertical alignment between platforms and trains.

Nigeria 
Plans by Nigeria's to change convert its  gauge lines to  have accelerated in 2020.  Some new lines are double track replacing single track sections.

Libya 
Libya started in 2007 building a completely new  railway system, albeit slowly.  A link across the Sahara to Central Africa, probably Nigeria, would also spur the growth of  connections, which make use of continuous access to the Middle East, Europe, and even China in the foreseeable future. In March 2011, the works ground to a halt because of the revolution with no news when or even if they would resume.

Tanzania, Kenya and Uganda 
Tanzania, Kenya and Uganda are odd men in the  South & East zone as they use  gauge.

The latest plans for a greatly expanded railway with links to adjoining countries are to build new lines in standard gauge and possibly upgrade and convert existing metre gauge lines to the same wider gauge.

Zambia 
  Mchinji - connects to Malawi Railways
  Chipata - railhead - opened 2010

Iron ore railways 
Heavy duty iron ore railways in Africa carry much more traffic than ordinary railways so they almost always adopt standard gauge to make use of proven off the shelf technology.  New such lines are planned for Cameroon, Senegal and Guinea.  Gabon is already using .  The Transguinean Railways is proposed to be standard gauge.  Some standard gauge lines in Liberia are to be restored.  An isolated  gauge line in Sierra Leone is to be converted to standard gauge.

High Speed Lines 

High Speed Lines (AIHSRN)

Conferences 

  - a conference held in Brazzaville on 10–14 April 2006.
 35th General Assembly
 2006

Timeline

2023 
The rail link on the Brazzaville–Kinshasa Bridge will be single track. Both sides of the bridge use the same 1067mm gauge. For compatibility with future AIHSRN a third rail or Dual Gauge sleepers should be provided.

2010 

 Dakar-Port Sudan Railway

2007 
 Railway Corridors in Continent to be Connected - The UAR is set to work out modalities on how to link all railway corridors in the continent.

Related organisations 
 Northern Corridor Transit and Transport Coordination Authority
 Southern African Railway Association
 United Nations Conference on Trade and Development (UNCTAD) 
 Southern African Railway Association
 ECOWAS rail

Similar organisations 
 Association of American Railroads (AAR)
 International Union of Railways (UIC)
 OSShD

See also 

 African Integrated High Speed Rail Network (AIHSRN) 
 AfricaRail
 East African Railway Master Plan
 North-South Corridor Project
 Timeline of African Union of Railways
 Trans-Asian Railway

References

African Union
Rail transport in Africa
Railway associations